Evan Bartels is an American singer-songwriter, musician, and writer from Nashville, Tennessee.

Biography 
Bartels grew up in Tobias, Nebraska as the second youngest of four kids. At the age of 5 years old he developed an interest in music and began learning piano during his early elementary school years. Around the age of 12 years old, Bartels received his first acoustic guitar and began teaching himself how to play. Through his teenage years he gained experience songwriting by playing in bands.

In 2017, Bartels spent a considerable amount of time on the road, performing 110 dates on his Great Americana Tour. Amidst his 2017 touring, while in Red Hook, Brooklyn, Bartels performed on NPR Music’s Night Owl music series via Facebook live.

Evan Bartels released his debut album, ‘The Devil, God & Me’, on Sower Records, on September 23, 2017. The album spent one week at No. 5 on the Billboard Heatseekers – West North Central chart.

Discography 
 The Devil, God & Me (2017)—Released September 23, 2017
Promised Land (2019) - Released April 26, 2019
 “Lonesome” (2021) Released September 17, 2021

References

External links 
 Official Website

Year of birth missing (living people)
Living people
Americana musicians
American male singer-songwriters
American country guitarists
American country songwriters
American male guitarists
American singer-songwriters